The Aref Ensemble (in Persian: گروه عارف) was a  Persian classical music ensemble. It was founded by maestro Parviz Meshkatian, Hossein Alizadeh, and Mohammad Reza Lotfi in 1977. The group was named after Aref Ghazvini, early 20th century Iranian poet and composer. Aref was dedicated to the promotion and advancement of Persian classical music. To some critics the Aref Ensemble, together with the Sheyda Ensemble (also founded by Meshkatian), revolutionised Persian music. 

In 1992 Meshkatian and the Aref Ensemble won first prize in the Spirit of the Earth Festival in England.

Vocals
Mohammad Reza Shajarian
Shahram Nazeri
Iraj Bastami
Hamid Reza Nourbakhsh
Alireza Eftekhari

References

See also
Music of Iran
Masters of Persian Music
Chemirani ensemble
Zoufonoun Ensemble
 List of Iranian musicians

Aref